Severe Tropical Storm Delfina was a damaging tropical cyclone that affected southeastern Africa in January 2003. The fourth named storm of the 2002–03 South-West Indian Ocean cyclone season, Delfina formed off the northwest coast of Madagascar on December 30, 2002. It quickly intensified while moving westward, becoming a strong tropical storm before hitting northeastern Mozambique on December 31. Delfina weakened while moving inland, and it was no longer classifiable as a tropical cyclone by January 1, 2003. However, its remnants moved across the country and into Malawi, later looping around and crossing back over Mozambique; the remnants of Delfina were last observed on January 9.

In both Mozambique and Malawi, Delfina dropped heavy rainfall that caused flooding. In the former country, over 18,000 houses were severely damaged or destroyed, leaving thousands homeless. The storm damaged roads and bridges, which disrupted relief efforts in the aftermath, and floods destroyed widespread areas of crops in the midst of an ongoing food shortage. Lingering flooding caused an outbreak of cholera and malaria in Mozambique, and 47 people were killed by Delfina. In Malawi, flooding was not widespread, although the storm destroyed about 3,600 houses and killed eight people. Only two months after the storm struck, however, Cyclone Japhet left damage and deaths in many of the same areas that Delfina affected.

Meteorological history

At 1100 UTC on December 30, 2002, the Joint Typhoon Warning Center (JTWC) noted in its Significant Tropical Weather Outlook that an area of convection persisted in the Mozambique Channel off the northwest coast of Madagascar. The system had a weak circulation, located in an area of minimal wind shear. At 1200 UTC that day, Météo-France classified the system as the sixth zone of disturbed weather of the season. It quickly developed, organizing into Tropical Disturbance 6 at 1800 UTC on December 30. At around the same time, the JTWC initiated advisories on Tropical Cyclone 08S. The convection became better organized, developing outflow and rainbands. With a ridge to the south, the storm tracked in a generally westward direction toward Mozambique. At 0600 UTC on December 31, MFR upgraded the system to Tropical Depression 6, and six hours later the agency upgraded it to Tropical Storm Delfina.

While approaching the Mozambique coastline, Delfina quickly intensified, developing en eye feature and reaching maximum 1-minute sustained winds of 100 km/h (65 mph). At 1800 UTC on December 31, MFR estimated peak 10-minute sustained winds of 95 km/h (60 mph). At about 2130 UTC, Delfina made landfall near Angoche in eastern Mozambique. It rapidly weakened while moving inland, and MFR discontinued advisories early on January 1, 2003. Delfina entered Malawi on January 2, where dry air affected the storm. The remnants turned to the northeast, drifting into Mozambique and later turning to the south. On January 6, it crossed over its track and emerged into the Mozambique Channel. When the remnants reached the Mozambique Channel, they were reclassified as Tropical Disturbance 07, which moved southward over waters. It re-intensified into a tropical storm on January 8 before weakening the next day, becoming extratropical. The remnants persisted for several days, dissipating on January 14.

Impact and aftermath

Upon striking Mozambique, Delfina produced strong winds and heavy rains, particularly in the northern portion of the country. A station in Nampula reported  in a 48‑hour period. Delfina washed out roads and bridges in Nampula and Zambezia provinces, which isolated towns and disrupted the transportation network. A train derailed due to effects from the storm, which cut rail travel between northern Mozambique and neighboring Malawi. The cyclone destroyed or severely damaged over 18,000 houses, which directly affected about 133,000 people, mostly in Nampula where 22,000 people were displaced. Floods along the Ligonha River forced 1,800 people to leave their homes. In Nampula and Zambezia, Delfina damaged four health facilities and 376 schools. The storm caused a power outage in Nampula for several days, and in Monapo, there were water shortages after the storm. Overall, Delfina resulted in $3.5 million in damage (2003 USD), and caused 47 deaths in the country, at least 19 due to flooding.

After Delfina moved through Mozambique, the local Red Cross chapter provided shelter, water, and relief items to the affected residents. Residual flooding in northern Mozambique, compounded with lack of drinking water, caused a cholera outbreak that affected at least 400 people. By January 27, 12 people had died from the disease. Flooding also caused a malaria outbreak that killed 45 people in the country. Government officials deployed food to the affected areas by airplane and by road, after workers repaired damaged bridges. Residents in Mozambique gradually recovered from storm damage in the weeks after it struck. Only two months after the storm struck, however, Cyclone Japhet left damage and deaths in many of the same areas.

In neighboring Malawi, the storm's remnants caused flooding in seven provinces, although it was not widespread. Delfina damaged roads, and destroyed one rail bridge in Balaka District. The storm destroyed about 3,600 houses; which forced about 30,000 people to leave their homes. The floods affected 57,000 properties, damaging  in the midst of a food shortage. Delfina killed eight people in Malawi, prompting President Bakili Muluzi to declare the country as a disaster area on January 11. After the storm, the Red Cross provided blankets and food for the affected residents. The damaged rail line that initially prevented relief supplies from entering the country was repaired in early February.

See also

 Tropical cyclones in 2002
 Weather of 2002
Cyclone Nadia – deadly cyclone that struck Mozambique in 1994
Tropical Storm Chedza - deadly tropical cyclone that struck Mozambique and Madagascar in 2015

Notes

References

External links
 Joint Typhoon Warning Center (JTWC) .
 Météo France (RSMC La Réunion).
 World Meteorological Organization

Delfina
Delfina
Delfina
2002 in Mozambique
2003 in Mozambique
2002 in Malawi
2003 in Malawi
Delfina
January 2003 events in Africa
Delfina
Delfina